Mount Zion AME Church was an African Methodist Episcopal Church in Greeleyville, South Carolina. The church building burned on June 20, 1995, as the result of arson by two Ku Klux Klan members. In 1996, President Bill Clinton traveled to Greeleyville for the dedication of the rebuilt church. The church was destroyed by fire again in June 2015 after being struck by lightning during an electrical storm.

See also
 Black Methodism in the United States

References

1996 establishments in South Carolina
2015 disestablishments in South Carolina
African Methodist Episcopal churches in South Carolina
Arson in South Carolina
Attacks on African-American churches
Buildings and structures demolished in 1995
Buildings and structures demolished in 2015
Buildings and structures in Williamsburg County, South Carolina
Church fires in the United States
Churches completed in 1996
Destroyed churches in the United States
Ku Klux Klan crimes
Religious buildings and structures in the United States destroyed by arson
Ku Klux Klan in South Carolina